So Sad may refer to:

Music
"So Sad" by George Harrison, 1973
"So Sad" (Gregorian song), 1991
"So Sad (Fade)" by Love Amongst Ruin, 2010
"So Sad (No Love of His Own)", an alternate title for the Harrison song, recorded by Alvin Lee and Mylon LeFevre for the album On the Road to Freedom
"So Sad (To Watch Good Love Go Bad)" by the Everly Brothers, 1960
So Sad, a 2001 EP by Vincent Gallo